Mezoneuron nhatrangense is a species of legume in the family Fabaceae. It is found only in Vietnam.

References

External links

Caesalpinieae
Endemic flora of Vietnam
Trees of Vietnam
Vulnerable plants
Taxonomy articles created by Polbot